Les observations de plusieurs singularitez et choses memorables trouvées en Grèce, Asie, Judée, Egypte, Arabie et autres pays estranges is a work of ethnographical, botanical and zoological exploration by Pierre Belon (1517–1564), a French naturalist from Le Mans. Starting in 1546, Belon travelled through Greece, Asia Minor, Egypt, Arabia and Palestine, returning to France in 1549.

His Observations, with illustrations, were first published in 1553. A second edition appeared in 1555. The work was translated into Latin by Charles de l'Écluse (Carolus Clusius) and published in 1589 under the title Petri Bellonii Cenomani plurimorum singularium et memorabilium rerum ... observationes. The Latin text was reprinted as an appendix to Clusius's Exoticorum libri decem (1605).

External links
 1553 edition at Gallica (Bibliothèque Nationale de France)
 1558 edition at Google Books

References 

1553 books
French travel books
Botany books
Ethnographic literature
Zoology books